Christopher Sherratt White  (born 9 September 1960) is a former New Zealand rower and Olympic Bronze medallist at the 1988 Summer Olympics in Seoul. He is described as "one of the giants of New Zealand rowing" and with 38 national titles, holds the record for most domestic rowing titles in New Zealand.

Life
White was born on 9 September 1960 in Gisborne, New Zealand. Richard White, an All Black, was his father. He was a member of the Waikato Rowing Club and in the 1980/81 rowing season, he became national champion in the coxed pairs, pairing with Greg Johnston and Noel Parris as cox. He first represented New Zealand at the 1981 World Rowing Championships in Oberschleißheim outside of Munich, Germany, where he rowed with the eight. With the New Zealand eight, he won world championships in 1982 and 1983 at Rotsee, Switzerland and at Wedau, Germany, respectively.

White competed at the 1984 Olympics in Los Angeles in the eights which finished fourth. At the 1988 Olympics, White won Bronze in the coxed four along with George Keys, Greg Johnston, Ian Wright and Andrew Bird (cox). At the 1992 Olympics in Barcelona and the 1996 Olympics in Atlanta in the coxless four, he finished fourth and thirteenth, respectively.

In 1986 he won Silver medals in the coxed four at both the Commonwealth Games in Edinburgh the World Rowing Championships in Nottingham. At the 1995 World Rowing Championships in Tampere, Finland, White won a Silver medal in the coxed four, with Murdoch Dryden, Andrew Matheson, Chris McAsey, and Michael Whittaker as cox. White has won a total of 38 National Rowing titles, easily the most in New Zealand. He was on the athletes' support staff for the 2002 Commonwealth Games in Manchester and has been on the New Zealand Olympic Committee’s athletes commission for eight years. He is also the manager of Olympic and World Champion rowers Caroline and Georgina Evers-Swindell.

In 1982, the 1982 rowing eight crew was named sportsman of the year. The 1982 team was inducted into the New Zealand Sports Hall of Fame in 1995. In the 2000 New Year Honours, White was appointed a Member of the New Zealand Order of Merit, for services to rowing.

References

|-

1960 births
Living people
New Zealand male rowers
Olympic rowers of New Zealand
Olympic bronze medalists for New Zealand
Rowers at the 1984 Summer Olympics
Rowers at the 1988 Summer Olympics
Rowers at the 1992 Summer Olympics
Rowers at the 1996 Summer Olympics
Commonwealth Games silver medallists for New Zealand
Rowers at the 1986 Commonwealth Games
Sportspeople from Gisborne, New Zealand
Olympic medalists in rowing
World Rowing Championships medalists for New Zealand
Medalists at the 1988 Summer Olympics
Commonwealth Games medallists in rowing
Medallists at the 1986 Commonwealth Games